The Labour Party (LP) is one of the three major contemporary political parties in Nigeria, along with the Peoples Democratic Party (PDP) and the All Progressives Congress (APC). It is a social democratic political party in Nigeria. The party was created in 2002 and was previously known as the Party for Social Democracy (PSD) before changing to its current name the following year. Built on the ideology of social democracy, the party aims to promote and defend social democratic principles and ideals for the purpose of achieving social justice, progress and unity.

On 27 May 2022, the party's membership and support increased drastically as the former governor of Anambra State, Peter Obi, joined the party shortly after he quit the People's Democratic Party (PDP) in a bid to run for the 2023 Nigerian presidential election.

History

The party was formed in 2002 as the Party for Social Democracy, and was established by the Nigeria Labour Congress. Its name was officially changed to the Labour Party after the 2003 general election.

In 2007, Olusegun Mimiko, ran successfully as governor of Ondo State under the banner of the Labour Party for a period of two terms (2009–2017), only to return to the PDP in 2020.

2021 
After the late National Chairman, Alhaji Abdulkadir Abdulsalam died in 2020, the party went through a serious leadership crisis. Barrister Julius Abure, who was the National Secretary of the Labour Party, was elected as the new National Chairman by the Labour Party National Executive Council (NEC) in 2021. The former Deputy National Chairman of the party Calistus Okafor, challenged Barrister Julius Abure after he claimed to be the authentic National Chairman of the party by virtue of his position.

2022 

Former governor of Anambra State, Peter Obi, joined the party after leaving the Peoples Democratic Party due to issues he had at the party that were at variance with his persona and principles. He emerged as the 2023 presidential candidate of the party after Pat Utomi, Faduri Joseph and Olubusola Emmanuel-Tella stepped down from the contest, making him the only aspirant in the presidential primaries. Gbadebo Rhodes-Vivour emerged as the governorship candidate of the party in Lagos state.

2023 
Just before the 2023 Nigerian general election, the party obtained the support of both the Nigeria Labour Congress and the Trade Union Congress of Nigeria. The trade union federations advised their members to vote for Peter Obi. This is the first time the trade union federations expressed explicit support for a political party.

Party symbols

Party logo 
The logo of the party is a wheel with a man and woman with a child engraved in the centre.

The wheel stands for industry and work as basis for economic empowerment of the populace and the prosperity of the nation, i.e. continuous economic growth and development. The linkage, between the wheel and man, woman and child connotes that governance, economic and social development must lead to the advancement of human beings.

Party flag 
The flag of the party is red and green, both equal in size, placed vertically, with Red representing transformation and Green representing agriculture. The logo of the Party is at the centre of the flag.

Electoral history

Presidential elections

Gubernatorial elections

House of Representatives and Senate elections

References

External links

2002 establishments in Nigeria
Labour parties
Political parties established in 2002
Social democratic parties in Nigeria